In mathematics, especially in topology, a stratified space is a topological space that admits or is equipped with a stratification, a decomposition into subspaces, which are nice in some sense (e.g., smooth or flat).

A basic example is a subset of a smooth manifold that admits a Whitney stratification. But there is also an abstract stratified space such as a Thom–Mather stratified space.

On a stratified space, a constructible sheaf can be defined as a sheaf that is locally constant on each stratum.

Among the several ideals, Grothendieck's Esquisse d’un programme considers (or proposes) a stratified space with what he calls the tame topology.

A stratified space in the sense of Mather

Mather gives the following definition of a stratified space. A prestratification on a topological space X is a partition of X into subsets (called strata) such that (a) each stratum is locally closed, (b) it is locally finite and (c) (axiom of frontier) if two strata A, B are such that the closure of A intersects B, then B lies in the closure of A. A stratification on X is a rule that assigns to a point x in X a set germ  at x of a closed subset of X that satisfies the following axiom: for each point x in X, there exists a neighborhood U of x and a prestratification of U such that for each y in U,  is the set germ at y of the stratum of the prestratification on U containing y.

A stratified space is then a topological space equipped with a stratification.

Pseudomanifold

In the MacPherson's stratified pseudomanifolds; the strata are the differences Xi+i-Xi between sets in the filtration. There is also a local conical condition; there must be an almost smooth atlas where locally each little open set looks like the product of two factors Rnx c(L); a euclidean factor and the topological cone of a space L. Classically, here is the point where the definitions turns to be obscure, since L is asked to be a stratified pseudomanifold. The logical problem is avoided by an inductive trick which makes different the objects L and X.

The changes of charts or cocycles have no conditions in the MacPherson's original context. Pflaum asks them to be smooth, while in the Thom-Mather context they must preserve the above decomposition, they have to be smooth in the Euclidean factor and preserve the conical radium.

See also

Equisingularity
Perverse sheaf
Stratified Morse theory
Harder–Narasimhan stratification

Footnotes

References
Appendix 1 of R. MacPherson, Intersection homology and perverse sheaves, 1990 notes
J. Mather, Stratifications and Mappings, Dynamical Systems, Proceedings of a Symposium Held at the University of Bahia, Salvador, Brasil, July 26–August 14, 1971, 1973, pages 195–232.
Markus J. Pflaum, Analytic and Geometric Study of Stratified Spaces: Contributions to Analytic and Geometric Aspects (Lecture Notes in Mathematics, 1768) ; Publisher, ‎Springer;

Further reading

https://ncatlab.org/nlab/show/stratified+space
https://mathoverflow.net/questions/258562/correct-definition-of-stratified-spaces-and-reference-for-constructible-sheave
Chapter 2 of Greg Friedman, Singular intersection homology
 https://ncatlab.org/nlab/show/poset-stratified+space

Stratifications
Topology